Pazar3 is an online marketplace founded in 2006. Payments between buyer and seller are made offline.

Countries 
 North Macedonia — Pazar3.mk
 Albania — MerrJep.al
 Kosovo — MerrJep.com
 Serbia — Mojtrg.rs
 Montenegro — Mojtrg.me
 Afghanistan — Leelam.af

References 
http://www.time.mk/r/c/7aa7f6ae98/
http://bi.mk/pazar3-deset-godini-najsnabden-pazar-vo-makedonija/
http://bi.mk/pazar3-mk-vovede-nova-funkcija-za-komuniciranje-pazar3-chat/
http://www.fakulteti.mk/news/16-07-18/makedoncite_najmnogu_kupuvaat_polovni_korsi_i_pezho_206_do_2_000_evra.aspx

Internet properties established in 2006
Companies of North Macedonia
Macedonian companies established in 2006